Marmara Archipelago (Turkish; Marmara Takimadaları) is a group of islands located in the South of the Sea of Marmara, belonging to the Balıkesir Province of Turkey. The Marmara Islands consist of four inhabited and 17 uninhabited islands. The archipelago has one small central town called Marmara (population 2000) and 13 villages. The inhabited islands are Marmara, Avsa, Pasalimani and Ekinlik.

The two islands are divided between the different districts of the Balıkesir Province. Avsa and Ekinlik belong to Marmara District, which is the biggest island in the area, and Pasalimani belongs to Erdek District, which is located in Kapidagi Peninsula.

Marmara is a mountainous and island with a mostly green landscape. The island has beaches, hotels and pensions although it is not a popular tourist spot. Avşa is a smaller island with less vegetation, less mountainous landscape, more beaches, more nightlife alternatives and is bustling during the summer season. Pasalimanı and Ekinlik Islands have few tourists, less vegetation and minimal facilities for travelers.

Inhabited islands
Marmara Island - 117.8 square km (Population: 6.800). Villages; Marmara (center), Gundogdu, Cinarli, Asmali, Topagac, Saraylar
Avşa Island - 36 square km (Population: 2527). Villages; Avsa (center), Yigitler
Paşalimanı Island - 21.3 square km (Population: approx 1500). Villages; Pasalimani, Harmanli, Tuzla, Balikli, Poyrazli
Ekinlik Island - 3.27 square km (Population: 102)

Archipelago
Marmara Archipelago Marmara Adaları, Arap Adaları, Marmaron, Marmaros, Proconnesus, Prokonnesos
Avşa Island Türkeli, Afusia, Afissia, Afyssia, Afisia, Afousia, Afisya, Ophioussa, Ophiousa, Ofiousa, Ofiusa, Aosia, Araplar, Arablar, Panagia, Avşar
Ekin Kayası Island; Fener, Round Rock
Martı Island
Ekinlik Island Kutali, Koútali, Akanthos, Ekenlik, Arktónēssos, Κούταλη, Άρκτόνησος
Erdek Islands
Tavşan Island; Erdek, Artake
Zeytinli Island
İmralı Island Aigaion, Besbicus, Besbikos, Kalolimnos, Kalolimni, Galios, Galyos, Emir Ali
Kapıdağ Islands
Akçaada Island; Akça, Fatih
Martı Kayası Island
Koyun Island Phoibe, Phivi, Kuyus
Hacı Islands
Hasır Island
Soğan Island
Mamalı Island; Mamalya, Mamalia
Marmara Island Proikonesos, Prokonnesos, Proikonnesos, Prokonnisos, Prikonnisos, Proconnesus, Marmaron, Marmaros, Marmora, Elafonisos, Elaphonnesos, Elafonessos, Neuris
Anataş Island; Adataş, Adalaş, Batizona
Eşek Islands
Eşek Island; Işık, Nisi
Kayainönü Island
Fener Island; Fenerada, Fanar, Asmalı, Asmalıada, Delphakie, Delphakia, Polydora, Polydori
Hayırsız Island; Skopelos
Paşalimanı Island Halónē, Alóni, Haloni, Aulonia, Alonya, Alonisos, Nea Prokennos, Porphyrione, Porfyrioni, Άλώνη, Αλώνη
Hızır Reis Island; Hızırreis
Kötürüm Island
Kuş Island; Bala, Pala
Palamut Island
Yer Island; Nísos Panagía

Access
The distance from Istanbul to Marmara Island is 76 nautical miles. Transport facilities vary depending on the season. During the summer season many tourists visit the islands. Avşa and Marmara have daily connections from Istanbul from May to October. Connections are available everyday from Tekirdağ and Erdek. Paşalimanı has daily transport from Erdek District only. Ekinlik Island has connections through Erdek District and Avşa Island.

References

Islands of the Sea of Marmara
Archipelagoes of Turkey
Landforms of Balıkesir Province
Important Bird Areas of Turkey